Dorothy Reynolds (26 January 1913 – 7 April 1977) was a British writer and actress.

She is mainly known for writing a number of musicals in collaboration with Julian Slade. The best known were Salad Days and Free as Air.

Filmography
Lady L (1965)
Oh! What a Lovely War (1969) - Heckler at Pankhurst Speech

References

External links 
biography

20th-century British writers
1913 births
1977 deaths
20th-century British actresses